, also known by the Chinese-style name Heqing (河清), was a Japanese noble of the Nara period. He was the fourth son of the sangi Fujiwara no Fusasaki, the founder of the Fujiwara Hokke.

As an envoy to Tang China, he served the Tang court along with Abe no Nakamaro, but due to storms and the An Lushan Rebellion he was unable to return to his home, and died in China.

Life 
With the ascension of Empress Kōken in 749, he was appointed as sangi, beating his older brother Fujiwara no Nagate to the ranks of the kugyō.

In 750, Kiyokawa was appointed envoy to Tang China, with Ōtomo no Komaro and Kibi no Makibi as vice-envoys. Upon arriving in Tang China, the envoy entered Chang'an and had an audience with Emperor Xuanzong, who praised them as proper gentlemen.

At the New Year's greeting ceremony in 753 where the various domains offered well-wishes to the Tang Emperor, the Japanese delegation was seated in the second position on the west side, after the Tibetan Empire. Meanwhile, Silla was seated in the first position on the east side. Komaro protested, and the Japanese envoy changed seats with Silla in order to save face.

Almost a year later, Kiyokawa's group set out to return to Japan, accompanied by Abe no Nakamaro, who had lived in China for 35 years and was a high official there as well. The monk Jianzhen wished to accompany them, but as the Tang government had forbidden his departure from China, Kiyokawa refused him. However, the vice-envoy Komaro snuck him on board. Their ships departed from Yangzhou, but the boat carrying Kiyokawa and Nakamaro met a strong headwind and washed ashore farther south, in what is now northern Vietnam. The natives attacked the ship, killing many of its crew, and Kiyokawa and Nakamaro barely escaped with their lives. The second ship, carrying Jianzhen, reached Japan without incident. In 755, Kiyokawa and Nakamaro returned to Chang'an.

In 759, a delegation led by  entered China through Balhae to take Kiyokawa home. However, because China was in a state of turmoil due to the An Lushan Rebellion, the Tang court forbade his return due to the danger of the roads.

Still unable to return to Japan, Kiyokawa spent another decade in China before another Japanese envoy arrived in 777, and in 778 he died, still in China. Having at some point married a Chinese woman, he had one daughter, named , who accompanied the envoy back to Japan.

Notes 

Fujiwara clan
778 deaths
People of Nara-period Japan
Year of birth unknown
Japanese ambassadors to the Tang dynasty